Richard Malone may refer to:

 Richard Joseph Malone (born 1946), American former Catholic Bishop of Buffalo
 Richard Malone, 1st Baron Sunderlin (died 1816), Anglo-Irish politician and peer
 Richard Malone (Irish MP), Irish barrister and politician
 Richard Brent Malone (1941–2004), Bahamian photorealist painter
 Richard Malone (designer), Irish fashion designer
 Dick Malone, Scottish footballer